Memoirs of Joseph Grimaldi is the 1838 autobiography of the pioneering nineteenth-century clown Joseph Grimaldi. It was edited by Charles Dickens who as a seven-year-old had first seen Grimaldi perform.

References

Notes
 Charles Dickens, Memoirs of Joseph Grimaldi, Pushkin Press, London, 2008.
 Richard Findlater, Memoirs of Joseph Grimaldi, MacGibbon & Kee, 1968.
 Richard Findlater, Grimaldi: King of Clowns, 1955.

External links

Online Texts
 Memoirs of Joseph Grimaldi at Internet Archive.

1838 non-fiction books
Grimaldi, Joseph